Samuel Thomas Murray Johnstone (19 May 1925 – 21 July 2012) was an Australian rules footballer who played with St Kilda in the Victorian Football League (VFL).

Education
He attended Caulfield Grammar School.

See also
 List of Caulfield Grammar School people

Notes

References

External links 

1925 births
Australian rules footballers from Victoria (Australia)
St Kilda Football Club players
People educated at Caulfield Grammar School
2012 deaths